The Bogor Line, also known as KRL Commuter Line Jakarta Kota–Bogor/Nambo is a commuter rail line in Indonesia, operated by PT Kereta Commuter Indonesia (KCI). The line connects Jakarta Kota station in West Jakarta and Bogor station in Bogor, West Java. On maps and diagrams, the line is shown using the color "red". The line is the busiest in the KA Commuter system.

The Bogor Line was the second electrified rail line to be built, after Tanjung Priuk-Jatinegara line. Until May 2022, the elevated tracks and stations between Jakarta Kota and Manggarai are shared with the Cikarang Line, whereas the ground tracks and stations between Manggarai and Bogor are shared with the Loop Line.

After a planned switchover at Manggarai on 27 May 2022, the line was renamed as Bogor Line with new abbreviation (B). Before the renaming, it was named as the Central Line with the abbreviation (C) on system maps until May 2022. The former abbreviation would be later used for the Cikarang Loop Line. It absorbed Nambo branch line from the deactivated Loop Line.

Stations

Nambo branch line

Proposed extension 
Ministry of Transportation have attempted to examine the possibility of extending the line beyond Bogor towards Sukabumi. In February 2021, a tender for feasibility study for Bogor-Lido (near Cigombong station) track electrification was announced by  Jabodetabek Transportation Authority on the ministry's e-procurement website. In May 2021, a regional office of the ministry posted an update to existing Bogor-Sukabumi double-tracking project, mentioning the possibility of KRL Commuterline extension to Sukabumi.

Incidents and accidents

 On 18 June 2011, during the trial for the new Commuterline services, an angry passenger threw stones at a former Tokyu 8500 series trainset number 8613F on idle at Jakarta Kota station, damaging its crucial components, because he was confused by the new train system.
On Thursday, October 4, 2012, a former Tokyo Metro 05 series trainset (no. 05-007F) travelling as KA 435 derailed on a switch before Cilebut station, with the third car impacted station platform's end. No fatal injury reported, the whole trainset was later written off due to damage beyond repair.
23 September 2015 – Two electric trains (former 205 series trainset no. 205-54F and 205-123F) travelling as KA 1154 and KA 1156 (both serving Central line, Bogor-bound) were involved in a rear-end collision at Juanda Station. No one was killed, but 42 passengers were hurt, with some required intensive treatment. Some cars involved returned to service combined in trainset 205-54F, while the rest was written off

Pre-2011 route and services reform 

 20 September 1968, an Economy local train hauled by class 3200 electric locomotive travelling as KA 406 to Bogor collided with another economy train (KA 309) to Jakarta near Ratu Jaya, Depok. 46 deaths and 115 injuries reported. The crash was attributed to malfunctioning indicator in the signaling system as well as lack of verification by the dispatcher.
2 November 1993, two Economy train, both of Rheostatic EMU class from 1976 and 1980s batch, running this line were involved in a head on collision near Ratu Jaya, Depok around 07:30 am during the morning rush hour. 20 people were killed, including drivers of both trains, and further 100 was injured. Being the same type, 4 surviving cars from both side were combined, colloquially known as CatDog trainset. The rest were written off. This accident prompted the government to start double-tracking project of the Depok-Bogor segment of the line.
4 October 2003, KRL Holec KL3-97242F travelling as KA 490 (Economy) bound for Bogor collided with the rear end of a fellow KRL Holec train KL3-94212F traveling as KA 488 (Economy) also bound for Jakarta Kota on this line between Cilebut and Bogor stations. 39 people were injured.
12 December 2003, a KRL Rheostatic trainset KL3-76112F set in idle position on Bogor station prepared for KA 459 (Economy) slid uncommanded down the line all the way until stopped by the steeper upward climb of the Manggarai-Cikini elevated track. Further investigation proved the trainset was not secured enough to prevent it to slide away from idle position.
30 June 2005, KRL Rheostatic KL3-76110F travelling as KA 583 (Economy) from Bogor bound for Jakarta Kota collided with the rear end of a KRL Holec trainset KL3-2000202F traveling as KA 585 (Economy) on the same line between Tanjung Barat and Pasar Minggu stations. 5 deaths and 113 injuries reported.
2 January 2007, KA 241 (Economy) running on Bojong Gede-Jakarta Kota sector derailed while reaching track 10 of Jakarta Kota terminus station, no casualty reported.
5 June 2009,  KRL Holec travelling as KA 521 (Economy) bound for Jakarta Kota collided with the rear end of a former Toyo Rapid 1000 series trainset traveling as KA 265 (Express) on this line between Tebet and Manggarai stations.
4 August 2009 – Former Toei 6000 series trainset no. 6151F traveling as KA 211 (Express) collided with the rear end of KRL Holec KL3-97234F travelling as KA 549 (Economy) on this line between Bogor and Cilebut stations. Assistant driver and a technician on board KA 211 was killed. Some cars from KA 211 involved returned to service redistributed to other trainsets, including 6181F (involved in other accident) and shortened 4-car 6151F well until Commuterline era, while the rest (including the Holec trainset) was written off

References

External links 
 KRL Jabotabek website 
 Jabotabek Railnews 
 KRL Jabodetabek 

Jakarta
Infrastructure in Indonesia
Transport in Jakarta
Transport in West Java